The Port of Singapore refers to the collective facilities and terminals that conduct maritime trade, and which handle Singapore's harbours and shipping. It has been ranked as the top maritime capital of the world, since 2015. Currently the world's second-busiest port in terms of total shipping tonnage, it also transships a fifth of the world's shipping containers, half of the world's annual supply of crude oil, and is the world's busiest transshipment port. It had also been the busiest port in terms of total cargo tonnage handled until 2010, when it was surpassed by the Port of Shanghai.

Because of its strategic location, Singapore has been a significant entrepôt and trading post for at least two centuries. During the contemporary era, its ports have not become just a mere economic boon for the country, but an economic necessity because Singapore is lacking in land and natural resources. The Port is critical for importing natural resources, and then later re-exporting products after they have been domestically refined and shaped in some manner, for example wafer fabrication or oil refining to generate value added revenue. The Port of Singapore is also the world's largest bunkering port. The majority of ships that pass between the Indian Ocean and the Pacific Ocean go through the Singapore Strait. The Straits of Johor on the country's north are impassable for ships due to the Johor-Singapore Causeway, built in 1923, which links the town of Woodlands, Singapore to the city of Johor Bahru in Malaysia.

History

Before 1819

In the late 13th century, a Kingdom known as Singapura was established on the north bank of the Singapore River around what was called the Old Harbour. It was the only port in the southern part of the Strait of Malacca and serviced ships and traders in the region, competing with other ports along the coast of the Malacca Strait such as Jambi, Kota Cina, Lambri, Semudra, Palembang, South Kedah and Tamiang. The port had two functions. First, it made available products that were in demand by international markets; according to the Daoyi Zhilüe (Brief Annals of Foreign Islands, 1349) by Chinese trader Wang Dayuan (born 1311, fl. 1328–1339), these included top-quality hornbill casques, lakawood and cotton. Although these goods were also available from other Southeast Asian ports, those from Singapore were unique in terms of their quality. Secondly, Singapore acted as a gateway into the regional and international economic system for its immediate region. South Johor and the Riau Archipelago supplied products to Singapore for export elsewhere, while Singapore was the main source of foreign products to the region. Archaeological artefacts such as ceramics and glassware found in the Riau Archipelago evidence this. In addition, cotton was transshipped from Java or India through Singapore.

In 1984, an archaeological excavation had commenced at Fort Canning Hill led by the archaeologist Dr John Miksic. A range of artefacts including earthenware, ceramic, and porcelain pieces were found which suggests Singapore's role as an active trading port in the 14th century.

By the 15th century, Singapore had declined as an international trading port due to the ascendance of the Malacca Sultanate. Local trade continued on the island. A map of Singapore by Portuguese mathematician Manuel Godinho de Eredia showed the location of Xabandaria or the office of a shahbandar, the Malay official responsible for international trade. Shards of 15th-century Siam ceramics and late 16th – or early 17th-century Chinese blue and white porcelain have been found at the Singapore and Kallang Rivers. Singapore also provided other regional ports with local products demanded by international markets. For instance, blackwood (a generic term used by Europeans to refer to rosewood) was exported from Singapore to Malacca, and was in turn purchased by Chinese traders and shipped to China for furniture-making:)

In the early 17th century, Singapore's main settlement and its port were destroyed by a punitive force from Aceh. After this incident, there was no significant settlement or port at Singapore until 1819.

1819–1960

In 1819, Stamford Raffles, a British colonial official, excited by the deep and sheltered waters in Keppel Harbour, established for the British Empire a new settlement and international port on the island or a trading port. Keen to attract Asian and European traders to the new port, Raffles directed that land along the banks of the Singapore River, particularly the south bank, be reclaimed where necessary and allocated to Chinese and English country traders to encourage them to establish a stake in the port-settlement. Chinese traders, because of their frequent commercial interactions with Southeast Asian traders throughout the year, set up their trading houses along the lower reaches of the river, while English country traders, who depended on the annual arrival of trade from India, set up warehouses along the upper reaches. The port relied on three main networks of trade that existed in Southeast Asia at that time: the Chinese network, which linked Southeast Asia with the southern Chinese ports of Fujian and Guangdong; the Southeast Asian network, which linked the islands of the Indonesian archipelago; and the European and Indian Ocean network, which linked Singapore to the markets of Europe and the Indian Ocean littoral. These networks were complementary, and positioned Singapore as the transshipment point of regional and international trade. By the 1830s, Singapore had overtaken Batavia (now Jakarta) as the centre of the Chinese junk trade, and also become the centre of English country trade, in Southeast Asia. This was because Southeast Asian traders preferred the free port of Singapore to other major regional ports which had cumbersome restrictions. Singapore had also supplanted Tanjung Pinang as the export gateway for the gambier and pepper industry of the Riau–Lingga Archipelago by the 1830s, and South Johor by the 1840s. It had also become the centre of the Teochew trade in marine produce and rice.

As the volume of its maritime trade increased in the 19th century, Singapore became a key port of call for sailing and steam vessels in their passage along Asian sea routes. From the 1840s, Singapore became an important coaling station for steam shipping networks that were beginning to form. Towards the late 19th century, Singapore became a staple port servicing the geographical hinterland of the Malay Peninsula. Following the institution of the British Forward Movement, Singapore became the administrative capital of British Malaya. Roads and railways were developed to transport primary materials such as crude oil, rubber and tin from the Malay Peninsula to Singapore to be processed into staple products, and then shipped to Britain and other international markets. During the colonial period, this was the most important role of the port of Singapore.

1963–2021
Singapore ceased to be part of the British Empire when it merged with Malaysia in 1963. Singapore lost its hinterland and was no longer the administrative or economic capital of the Malay Peninsula. The processing in Singapore of raw materials extracted in the Peninsula was drastically reduced due to the absence of a common market between Singapore and the Peninsular states.

Since Singapore's full independence in 1965, it has had to compete with other ports in the region to attract shipping and trade at its port. It has done so by developing an export-oriented economy based on value-added manufacturing. It obtains raw or partially manufactured products from regional and global markets and exports value-added products back to these markets through market access agreements such as World Trade Organization directives and free trade agreements.

By the 1980s, maritime trading activity had ceased in the vicinity of the Singapore River except in the form of passenger transport, as other terminals and harbours took over this role. Keppel Harbour is now home to three container terminals. Other terminals were built in Jurong and Pasir Panjang as well as in Sembawang in the north. Today, the port operations in Singapore are handled by two players: PSA International (formerly the Port of Singapore Authority) and Jurong Port, which collectively operate six container terminals and three general-purpose terminals around Singapore.

In the 1990s the Port became more well-known and overtook Yokohama, and eventually became the busiest port in terms of shipping tonnage.

Singapore is part of the Maritime Silk Road that runs from the Chinese coast to the southern tip of India, to Mombasa, from there through the Red Sea via the Suez Canal to the Mediterranean, to the Upper Adriatic region of the northern Italian hub Trieste with its rail connections to Central Europe and the North Sea.

Since 2022 

The Tuas Mega Port is projected to be the only port in Singapore after the PSA city terminals and Pasir Panjang Terminal are closed in 2027 and 2040 respectively, ending an era of port operations in the city area which began in 1819. The Sea Transport Industry Transformation Map (ITM) launched by the Maritime and Port Authority of Singapore (MPA) aims to grow the industry's value-add by $4.5 billion and create more than 5,000 new jobs by 2025.

Automation will be a key part of the new port, with over 1,000 battery-powered driverless vehicles and a fleet of almost 1,000 automated yard cranes to be developed for the port. Nelson Quek, PSA Singapore's head of Tuas planning stated that "Tuas, when it's fully developed, is going to be the single largest fully-automated terminal in the world". It will also be able to cater to the demands of the world's largest container ships, with 26 km of deep-water berths. Besides just handling containers, the port will have space set aside for companies to be located, a move that aims to improve the links between port and businesses. It is projected to be twice the size of Ang Mo Kio new town.

Operations at Tuas Mega Port began in September 2021, and the port officially opened on September 1, 2022 with three berths in service.

Operations

The port is the world's busiest port in terms of shipping tonnage handled, with 1.15 billion gross tons (GT) handled in 2005. In terms of cargo tonnage, Singapore is behind Shanghai with 423 million freight tons handled. The port retains its position as the world's busiest hub for transshipment traffic in 2005, and is also the world's biggest bunkering hub, with 25 million tonnes sold in the same year.

Singapore is ranked first globally in 2005 in terms of containerised traffic, with 23.2 million Twenty-foot equivalent units (TEUs) handled. High growth in containerised traffic has seen the port overtaking Hong Kong since the first quarter of 2005, and has led the race ever since, with an estimated 19,335 kTEUs handled in the year up to October, compared to 18,640 kTEUs handled in Hong Kong in the same period. A rise in regional traffic consolidating the port's position in Southeast Asia, and increases in transshipment traffic using the strategic East Asia-Europe route via Singapore helped the port to emerge tops at the end of the year, a title it had not held since overtaking Hong Kong once in 1998.

Operators

PSA Singapore's container facilities are as follows:
Container berths: 52
Quay length: 15,500 m
Area: 600 hectares
Max draft: 16 m
Quay cranes: 190
Designed capacity: 35,000 kTEU

PSA Singapore has 13 berths which are part of the Pasir Panjang Container Terminal's Phase Two which are due for completion by 2009. Phase Three and Four will add another 16 berths and are expected to be completed by 2013.

Jurong Port's facilities are as follows:
Berths: 32
Berth length: 5.6 km
Maximum vessel draft: 15.7 m
Maximum vessel size: 
Area: 127 Hectares Free Trade Zone, 28 Hectares non-Free Trade Zone
Warehouse facilities: 178,000 m2

PSA Singapore also has a 40-year contract to operate the tax-free Gwadar Port on the southwestern coast of Pakistan.  Gwadar started operation in March 2008, with 3 multi-purpose berths, a 602-meter quay, and 12.5-meter depth.  Another 9 berths are under construction, with a 20-meter depth. In 2015, it was announced that the port would be leased to the Chinese till 2059 and further developed under the China-Pakistan Economic Corridor.

Terminals

See also
Jurong Island
List of ports and harbors of the Pacific Ocean
Pulau Bukom
Pulau Sebarok

References

Further reading

History

Borschberg, Peter (2018). “Three questions about maritime Singapore, 16th and 17th Centuries”, Ler História, 72: 31-54. https://journals.openedition.org/lerhistoria/3234

Present day

External links

Live Camera to Port of Singapore
Official website of the Maritime and Port Authority of Singapore
Port operational statistics

SG Bicentennial: A Port's Story - a video series about the history of the port of Singapore, produced by PSA Singapore in 2019 to commemorate Singapore's Bicentennial.

Ports and harbours of Singapore
Shipping in Asia